Vincent Claudio Urbani (born in Rieti, Italy in 1985) is an Italian photographer. He studied advertising and marketing in the University for Foreigners Perugia and Professional Digital Photography at EFTI (escuela de fotografia y centro de imagen) in Madrid.

Urbani works in the advertising, fashion and reportage fields. Some of the celebrities he photographed are: Cristiano Ronaldo, Zinedine Zidane, Pedro Almodóvar, Rossy de Palma, Alessandro Baricco, Mario Vargas Llosa and musical artists like Casey Spooner, Jay-Jay Johanson, Mickaël Miro, CocoRosie, Skunk Anansie, Kishi Bashi and the band Of Montreal, amongst others.

His fashion editorials and various works were published in magazines such as Schön! Magazine, Elle Russia, The trip Magazine, Status Magazine, Disorder Magazine, Calle20 and Look as well as Rolling Stone, Inside Art. He also worked as photographer and artistic director for Alan Photo Studio in Spain. He distributes his times between Spain and others, notably Italy and Germany.

References

External links
Official website
Official blog

Italian photographers
1985 births
Living people
People from Rieti